The Las Flores Stakes  is an American Thoroughbred horse race held annually during the first week of April at Santa Anita Park in Arcadia, California. In 2015, due to the 2013 closing of Hollywood Park Racetrack and extensive rescheduling, the race was run in early March. Open to fillies and mares age four and older, the Grade III event is contested on Pro-Ride synthetic dirt over a distance of six and one half furlongs.

Until 2008 the race was run at a distance of six furlongs.

Inaugurated in 1951 as the Las Flores Handicap the event was run for three-year-olds and up from 1951 through 1959, for four-year-olds and up from January 1960, 1972, 1975, 1981 through 1987, and again in 1989, and for all ages December 1972, 1973 and 1979. 
It was run in January and December 1960, 1972, 1977 and 1987, in December 1960 through 1970, and December 1977, 1978 and 1987.

The Las Flores Handicap was run in two divisions in 1963. There was no race in 1953, 1969, 1971, 1974, 1980 or 1988.

In 2022 the race was run twice. Once in March and again in December.

Records
Speed record: 
 1:14.12 – Tiz Elemental (2008) (at present distance of 6.5 furlongs)
 1:08.02 – Ema Bovary (2004) (at previous distance of 6 furlongs)

Most wins:
 2 – Chop House (1963, 1964)

Most wins by a jockey:
 5 – Bill Shoemaker (1954, 1958, 1962, 1964, 1966)
 5 – Laffit Pincay Jr. (1970, 1983, 1985, 1989, 1999)

Most wins by a trainer:
 5 – Bob Baffert (2006, 2011, 2016, 2017, 2021)

Most wins by an owner:
 2 – Fred W. Hooper (1961, 1991)
 2 – M/M Bert W. Martin (1963, 1964)
 2 – Bernard J. Ridder (1972, 1977)
 2 – Siegel family (1990, 1992)

Winners

* † In 1964 there was a Dead heat for first.

References
 The 2008 Las Flores Handicap at the NTRA

Horse races in California
Santa Anita Park
Graded stakes races in the United States
Grade 3 stakes races in the United States
Flat horse races for four-year-olds
Open sprint category horse races
Recurring sporting events established in 1951
Annual sporting events in the United States
1951 establishments in California